Mercury (Cessily Kincaid) is a fictional character appearing in American comic books published by Marvel Comics. The character has appeared in the X-Men series. She is a teenage member of the student body at the Xavier Institute and a recurring member of the X-Men.

Publication history
Mercury first appeared in New Mutants, vol. 2 #2 in Aug. 2003.

Fictional character biography

Introduction
Cessily Kincaid, an Irish American, was raised in Portland, Oregon by her parents Mark and Jill, who, according to DeFilippis, used to dote over her.  When Cessily's powers manifested, her parents were disgusted and made her stay indoors so as to hide her mutation. In response, she was sent to the Xavier Institute where she befriended Julian Keller and was placed as Laurie Collins' roommate for a while. After the school was rebuilt, she was selected by Emma Frost to be on her Hellions squad.

She's extremely close to Santo Varroco and Julian Keller whom she spends most of her time with and looks upon like big brothers.  During that time, she developed a crush on her teammate Wither, but her feelings were not reciprocated.

Hellions Miniseries
The Hellions squad won the squad challenge, and during their summer vacation, they travelled with Julian to his home. There they encountered the Kingmaker, from whom they each received a trial wish. Cessily's wish was to have her parents accept and love her, a wish the Kingmaker granted by manipulating her parents with telepaths. When the Hellions eventually refused a permanent deal with the Kingmaker, Cessily's parents reverted to normal and Cessily returned to the institute, defeated.

Decimation
After the events of M-Day  only 27 students were left with their powers, including Cessily, although she would have preferred to lose her powers and was devastated that she did not. The depowered students and staff were sent home. One bus was bombed by anti-mutant religious zealot Reverend William Stryker, and Cessily's former teammate and friend Tag was among those killed. The X-Men held a funeral for those students whose parents would not accept them, and Cessily's anguish was very visible.

All of the remaining students were placed by Emma Frost into an all-out brawl, and the ones deemed to be the best were to be assigned to become a group of in-training X-Men. Cessily made the team and began training to become an X-Man.

Childhood's End and Nimrod
In the Childhood's End arc, Cessily and the New X-Men defeated Stryker, Josh killing him. Shortly afterwards the team went to help Forge who had been sought out by Nimrod for repair. During the skirmish X-23 was forced to sever a piece of Mercury's hand to separate her from Nimrod. She later commented she'd "always wanted to lose a few pounds." The team successfully defeated the robot due to combining the powers of Surge, Mercury, and X-23, and Nimrod was sent back in time.

Mercury Falling
After learning of Emma Frost's plan to have X-23 leave the school, Cessily takes Laura to Salem Center for coffee to cool Laura down. Just as Cessily realizes that Laura has feelings for Hellion, the coffee shop explodes. Facility agents led by Laura's former handler, Kimura come for one of them. Laura, believing it is her, begs Cessily to leave, but not before Kimura shoots Cessily with an electric bullet, incapacitating her. After capturing Cessily, Kimura leaves before Laura can recuperate from a grenade blast. At the lab, Cessily questions who they are and what they want but is given no answers. When she replies that her friends will come for her, Kimura informs that "The Elephant" (Mammomax) said the same thing while showing a picture of his corpse in a cell. Before dying, Stryker had requested a living weapon be made, a huge beast called Predator X. Mercury's metal skin was needed to give it added powers and durability. The Facility scientists strip some of Mercury's biometal, granting Predator X her powers. The experiments leave her physically and mentally traumatized, forcing her to recuperate for some time at the institute. She eventually regains some of her lost mass.

Quest for Magik
Mercury is recovering in bed after what happened to her in the last arc when the students are teleported to Limbo. She is held captive by Belasco but breaks free after he 'kills' X-23. She and Dust go up against Belasco and keep getting beaten down but refuse to give up, as both their mutant bodies are resistant to his magic and fight an inconclusive battle until Darkchylde and the other students arrive, teleported by Pixie. Mercury continues to fight alongside the other students, but can only watch as Belasco fends them off and proceeds to pull Earth into Limbo until he is defeated by Darkchylde and Pixie.

World War Hulk
Mercury is one of the students that intercepts the Hulk. Mercury helps in keeping Hulk pinned down in the first attack but is knocked away. When X-23 blinds him she joins in taking him down alongside Surge, Beast and X-23 but they are all knocked away when Hulk's eyes grow back. Mercury gets back up and attacks him from behind but Hulk grabs her and squishes her against the ground. Later while the rest of the X-Men are still defeated from the Hulk's attack, Mercury tries one more time to defeat the rampaging green goliath. During the course of the battle, the Hulk was shown the recent graveyards of all of the deceased mutants that died after M-Day. Mercury then describes in detail the deaths of Laurie Collins and Brian Cruz, causing the Hulk to understand his self-righteous tantrum is wrongly directed towards Xavier's affiliation with the Illuminati. Seeing these graveyards reminds the Hulk of his fallen companions on Sakaar, and with that understanding, he leaves Xavier unharmed.

Children of X-Men
Cessily still maintains her disapproval and distrust of Emma Frost after overhearing her conversation with X-23 during the "Mercury Falling" arc. She also feels that Emma has carelessly "lost" track of Wither and constantly reminds her of the fact that Kevin is no longer in the school or under her surveillance.

Mercury has also been deeply affected by the events of Decimation, as depicted in the "Endangered Species" miniseries. She is distraught by the death of a teenage civilian mutant and is one of the students at the institute trying to determine the youngest mutant, as she believes that the youngest mutant always tends to be killed. Mercury later comforts X-23 after she ran off and wrecked the woman's restroom in rage due to Surge kissing Hellion, and is later seen hanging out with her and Dust.

Messiah Complex
Mercury is one of the New X-Men led by Surge that launch a strike against the Purifiers to incapacitate them and rescue the mutant baby. After Hellion is critically wounded by Lady Deathstrike, Pixie panics and blindly teleports the entire team out of the Purifiers' base, spreading them out between Washington and New York. It does not appear that Cessily suffered any lasting injuries as a result. Iceman arrives with the X-Jet to bring them back to the mansion. She helps to stabilize Hellion in the X-Jet on the way back to the mansion. Later, she goes with Dust and Rockslide to visit the graveyard, and they discover that Predator X has entered the mansion grounds. Mercury battles the monster with the rest of the students and is transported by Pixie, along with the other New X-Men, to the battle between the X-Teams and Sinister's forces on Muir Isle.

Secret Invasion
Cessily is among the several X-Men helping to fight off Skrulls during their invasion of San Francisco.

Manifest Destiny
Mercury and X-23 are walking down Fisherman's Wharf when X-23 realizes Mercury is upset. Mercury misses her parents and feels like a freak because they were disgusted when her powers manifested. While playing with Silly Putty, she comments:

They are then attacked by 3 members of the Hellfire Cult and Mercury takes them all out. X-23 points out she is more than just lifeless metal, she is a person and a hero and to put her past behind her and look at who she is now. She just might like what she sees.

X-Infernus

Mercury and Rockslide are watching a training session between Pixie and Nightcrawler when Pixie stabs Kurt with her soul dagger. They run in and move Pixie away from Kurt's unconscious body, Beast enters and Pixie regains her senses. When she removes her dagger, Magik's soulsword emerges from his chest and Magik teleports in ready to reclaim her sword.

Mercury engages Magik in combat and manages to stab her in the shoulder; Illyana responds by blowing her up, noting that she has some immunity to magic, but is not invulnerable. After she reforms, she is placed on a team of X-Men being sent to Limbo along with Rockslide due to their resistance to magic.

Upon entering Limbo, the team fights their way through many demons. Pixie senses the darkness within her suddenly growing and she teleports off to Belasco's castle by herself.

Hearing the screams from the castle, Kurt teleports the X-Men into the throne room. Once there, Witchfire turns Colossus and Wolverine against Mercury and Rockslide who get taken out, leaving Kurt the last X-Man standing.

Utopia
Mercury, along with fellow students Onyxx and Loa, was tasked with keeping peace at the riots on Telegraph Hill after the mutant-hate group "Humanity Now!" marched from Sacramento to San Francisco to promote "Proposition X", displeasing many citizens of San Francisco, mutant and non-mutant alike. After the riots subsided on Telegraph Hill, Cyclops came and picked them up, taking them to City Hall. During the final battle against Norman Osborn's forces, along with Iceman and many of the other x-students, she takes on Mimic.

After Osborn's defeat by the X-Men and the official creation of Utopia, Mercury is involved in a media tug of war between Norman Osborn, her biological father and their claims that she is being held captive against her will. Although she confronts her father over the phone, during a live television broadcast, and disputes his claims going as far as to call him a bad father her situation gets more complicated as Deadpool intervenes.

Believing that he is doing them a favor he attempts to kill Mr. Kincaid on live television only to be stopped by Domino. However Deadpool is still attempting to follow through and kill Mercury's father. In the meantime, the X-Men plan on having Mercury declared an emancipated minor in order to counter Osborn. Kincaid is later saved from sniper fire in front the media by Wolverine, thus restoring the X-Men's damaged reputations. He confesses in an interview to the aforementioned witnesses that Norman Osborn put him up to everything.

The following storyline created some continuity errors as it was implied that Mr. Kincaid had been an absentee father for most of Mercury's life, and it also implied that he was divorced/separated from Mercury's mother. This is in direct conflict from the Hellion's mini-series which showed both Mercury's parents living together happily. Furthermore, in a New X-Men flashback during the Mercury Rising storyline it showed a concerned father discovering Cessily during the onset of her mutation.

Regenesis
Cessily left with Wolverine and returned to the school. In the first issue of Wolverine and the X-Men: Alpha & Omega, she is seen at school.

Powers and abilities

Mercury's body is composed of a non-toxic metal resembling mercury, which she can reshape or solidify at will, although she is still inexperienced in shape-shifting. Molecular adhesion power gives her the ability to cling to solid surfaces and move her body at will even without overt locomotive features.  She has also demonstrated superhuman strength by supporting huge slabs of concrete, though the extent of this strength is unknown.

It has also been said by her creators that she can potentially do anything the T-1000, from 1991 film Terminator 2: Judgment Day, can.  However, she has yet to demonstrate one key facet of the T-1000's shapeshifting—the ability to change the color and texture of her liquid metal to completely mimic a human form. Mercury often maintains her original red hair, suggesting that she has the ability to change her mercury's color and texture to a degree.

Electricity is her main weakness and has often been used against her, because it causes her body interference.

Due to her composition Mercury does not require food or drink. Only a few people know this, as Mercury "eats" to make herself feel more normal and to be able to interact with other people.

Since her body is not organic, she is one of the few people who can touch Wither - for whom she has unrequited feelings - without decaying. Her inorganic body also made her immune to the pheromone based powers of Wallflower and was placed as her roommate.

She can also control pieces of her liquid mercury and has the potential to bring it back to her like she almost did in the last issue of Mercury Falling. Usually, if forcefully separated from her body, her liquid mercury turns into dead flesh, as demonstrated during the Facility's experiments. Some of her mercury has been separated as living mercury tissue and was used for Predator X's skin.  She is currently less than her original mass, as she states that when Laura cut off her hands to save her during the fight with Nimrod, she "lost a few pounds."

Due to her transient form, she has some resistance to magic.

Other versions

House of M
 In the House of M reality, Cessily was a student at Karma's New Mutant Leadership Institute, and, unlike her 616 persona, was close with Laurie. When she learned of Prodigy's plan to help Surge find her terrorist father in Japan, she was against going, but then Laurie (a deep cover S.H.I.E.L.D. agent) changed her mind. Once in Japan, the young team found the Project Genesis the terrorists were trying to stop, and Laurie revealed her loyalties, making the Hellions attack the New Mutants. Mercury, however, was immune to pheromones, and pleaded with her friend to stop. When Laurie refused, Cessily was forced to stab her in the abdomen. Afterwards, Mercury joined the survivors in a last-ditch assault on Emperor Sunfire's forces.

In other media

Television
 Mercury appears in the Wolverine and the X-Men episodes "Greetings from Genosha" and "Battle Lines" as one of Magneto's Acolytes.

References

External links
 Marvel.com Mercury Profile

Comics characters introduced in 2003
Fictional bisexual females
Fictional characters from Oregon
Fictional characters who can stretch themselves
Marvel Comics characters who are shapeshifters
Marvel Comics female superheroes
Marvel Comics LGBT superheroes
Marvel Comics mutants
Characters created by Nunzio DeFilippis
Characters created by Christina Weir